Caroline Wozniacki was the defending champion but lost to Aravane Rezaï in the first round.

Ekaterina Makarova won the title, defeating Victoria Azarenka in the final 7–6(7–5), 6–4.

Seeds

Draw

Finals

Top half

Bottom half

References
Draw and Qualifying Draw

Singles
Aegon International